Henry Mills may refer to:

Henry Mills (Once Upon a Time), a fictional character in the TV series Once Upon a Time
Henry Mills (cricketer) (1847–1915), English cricketer
Henry Mills (British politician) (1868–1928), member of London County Council
Harry Mills (politician), Canadian politician
Rev. Henry Mills, Bad Girls character
Harry Mills (footballer) (1922–1990), English footballer

See also
Harry Mills (disambiguation)

Henry Milles, politician
Henry Mill (1683–1771), inventor